Bobby Williams (February 28, 1942 – August 10, 2012)  was an American football player who played five seasons in the National Football League (NFL), for the St. Louis Cardinals and the Detroit Lions. Williams mostly known as a return specialist and at different times in his career also played, running back, and defensive back,

Early life
Williams was born in Geiger, Alabama and grew up in Lincoln, Nebraska. He attended Lincoln High School where he participated in a variety of sports. He set Nebraska state records in the 100 yard dash, and the long jump the latter of which was later broken by Gale Sayers. He would attend Central State College in Edmond, Oklahoma. He played running back on the Central State Bronchos football team he had 3,094 all-purpose yards, and still holds the school record for kick return yards at 1,063. He also helped the Bronchos win the 1962 NAIA Football National Championship.

NFL career
Williams was drafted by the St. Louis Cardinals with in the 11th round and 163rd pick overall of the 1966 NFL Draft. He spent two years in St. Louis, before being traded to the Detroit Lions. He would play with the Lions for three more seasons. He would finish with 3 interceptions, and 2 kickoff return touchdowns.

References

1942 births
2012 deaths
Sportspeople from Lincoln, Nebraska
Central Oklahoma Bronchos football players
Central Oklahoma Bronchos men's track and field athletes
Arizona Cardinals players
Detroit Lions players